Million Dollar Money Drop: Singapore Edition was a game show which aired on MediaCorp Channel 5 in the Singapore. It was based on the UK series The Million Pound Drop Live. However, unlike the original UK version, it was not broadcast live, and there were several changes to the format. The show premiered on 9 August 2011, after the nation's 46th National Day Parade segment, and is hosted by George Young. The show's set, theme song and question cues was followed based on the British edition. About 300,000 people watched the premiere of the show: approximately 6% of the total population of Singapore at that time.

Game format

A team of two people with a pre-existing relationship is presented with SGD$1,000,000 in denominations of $50 in bundles of $25,000 (40 bundles = $1,000,000). The team must risk the entire amount on each correctly of eight multiple-choice questions.

For each question, the contestants choose one of two categories, then indicate which answer(s) they wish to risk their money on by moving the bundles of cash onto a row of trap doors, termed "drops," each of which corresponds to one answer. However, they must always keep at least one drop "clear" with no money on it. In addition, all eight questions have a time limit; any money that is not placed on an answer when time runs out will be lost.

Once the money is in place, the trap doors for the incorrect answers are opened, and the cash on them falls out of sight and is lost. The contestants then continue the game using the cash they had placed on the correct answer. They get to keep whatever money is left after the eighth question; if they lose everything before reaching this point, the game ends immediately and they leave with nothing.

Contestants and their winnings

 These players played for charity.
Bold denotes the winning pair

All statistics are accurate as of Season 1.
 Most money won: $75,000 (Justin & Vernon)
 Total winnings to date: $175,000
 Total amount of money dropped: $19,825,000
 Average amount of money dropped per contestant pair: $991,250.00
 Average amount of money dropped per question: $198,250.00
 Average amount of money dropped per episode: $1,525,000
 Total number of winners: 4
 Total number of contestants who lost everything: 16
 Total number of contestants who appeared on the show: 20
 Success rate: 20%
 Average winnings per winning contestant pair: $43,750
 Average winnings per episode to date: $13,461.54
 Average winnings per contestant pair to date: $8,750.00
 Longest $1 million remained in play: 3 questions (Sean & Shu Ming, Justin & Vernon, Li Qi & Xin)
 Most money lost in one question: $1 million (Eugene & Izam, Sean & Shu Ming)
 Most money lost in first question: $1 million (Eugene & Izam)
 Most money lost through one drop: $1 million (Sean & Shu Ming)
 Number of questions played so far: 100
 Number of questions answered correctly: 84
 Number of questions answered incorrectly: 16
 Average number of questions answered correctly: 4.20
 Most questions answered correctly: 8 (Justin & Vernon, Juliana & Willy, Shahlan & Shahreel, Li Qi & Xin)
 Least questions answered correctly: 0 (Eugene & Izam)

See also
 The Million Pound Drop Live
 Million Dollar Money Drop

References

External links
 Million Dollar Money Drop Singapore

Television series by Endemol
2011 Singaporean television series debuts
2011 Singaporean television series endings
Channel 5 (Singapore) original programming